Aroldo Bonzagni (24 September 1887 – 30 December 1918) was a painter, draftsman, and illustrator born in Cento, Italy.

He moved to Milan to attend the Accademia di Brera on a scholarship, joining the ranks of avant-garde artists and becoming friends with Carlo Carrà, Umberto Boccioni, and Luigi Russolo. 
He was extremely critical of the elite society of the times and signed the first Futurist Manifesto in 1910.

Bonzagni died from the Spanish influenza pandemic in Milan.
In Cento, the Galleria d'arte moderna Aroldo Bonzagni was established in 1959 in his memory.

Gallery

External links 
  Drawings by Aroldo Bonzagni (1887-1918)
 Galleria d'Arte Moderna Aroldo Bonzagni

Italian illustrators
Italian male painters
1887 births
1918 deaths
Brera Academy alumni
Deaths from Spanish flu
People from Cento
19th-century Italian painters
20th-century Italian painters
19th-century Italian male artists
20th-century Italian male artists